Vav Darreh (also Romanized as Vāv Darreh; also known as  Vāv Darreh Bozorg and Vāv Darreh-ye Bozorg) is a village in Farim Rural District, Dodangeh District, Sari County, Mazandaran Province, Iran. At the 2006 census, its population was 112, in 35 families.

References 

Populated places in Sari County